Dante's Inferno is a 2007 comedy film performed with hand-drawn paper puppets on a theater stage. The film was adapted from the book "Dante's Inferno" by Sandow Birk and Marcus Sanders (Chronicle Books, 2004), a modern update of the canticle Inferno from Dante Alighieri's epic poem Divine Comedy. The film chronicles Dante's (voiced by Dermot Mulroney) journeys through the underworld, guided by Virgil (voiced by James Cromwell). The head puppeteer was Paul Zaloom and the puppets were designed by Elyse Pignolet and drawn by Sandow Birk. The film premiered January 20, 2007 at the 2007 Slamdance Film Festival. The film has also been shown at the Santa Barbara International Film Festival, Sarasota Film Festival, Atlanta Film Festival, Newport Beach Film Festival, Maryland Film Festival, Silver Lake Film Festival, the Boston Underground Film Festival, and on the Ovation TV cable network.

The voice cast includes  actors associated with the Upright Citizens Brigade, Beakman's World, Crossballs, 30 Rock, Arrested Development, and Aqua Teen Hunger Force.

Plot

Voice cast
Tony Abatemacro - Lying Defendant, Farinata
Scott Adsit - Judge Minos, Paolo, Hirohito, Spiro Agnew
Matt Besser - Metallica Defendant, L. Ron Hubbard, Curtis LeMay, 
Bill Chott - Ciaccio 'El Gordo', Calvacanti, Joseph Stalin, Ulysses' Crew
Mike Coleman - Charon, Phlegyas, Senator, Dick Cheney
James Cromwell - Virgil
Andrew Daly - Lucan, "Right On" Glutton, Jim Jones, Airport Screener, Ulysses' Naysayer
John Fleck - Brunetto Latini
Sean Forrester - Horace, Filippo Argenti, White Pimp, Beating Victim, Airport Security, Insider Trader #2
Tony Hale - Ovid, Real Estate Broker, Pope Nicholas III
Tom Hallick - George Sanders, Deep Voiced Lobbyist
Brandon Johnson - Irate Driver, Mounted Policeman, Pimp #1, Pimp #3, Airport Security
Laura Krafft - George Sand, Airport P.A., Subway P.A.
Dermot Mulroney - Dante
Martha Plimpton - Celia, Lobbyist Singer, Lizzie Borden
Kit Pongetti - W.M.D. Defendant, Francesca, Marilyn Monroe, Elena Ceaușescu
Tami Sagher - George Eliot, Greed Seductress, Barbara Bates, Penelope
Dana Snyder - Strom Thurmond, Ulysses
Janet Varney - Teacher, Cleopatra, City of Dis Intercom, Ulysses' Usher
Matt Walsh - Benito Mussolini, Fox Reporter, Airport Security Pursuer
Paul Zaloom - Homer, God, Officer Chiron, Southern Lobbyist, Airport Security, Caiaphas, Ulysses' Crew, Macmud, Insider Trader #1, Nicolae Ceaușescu

Mark Ritts - Gianciotto or Giovanni Malatesta

Reception
Film critic Curt Holman gave the film 3 stars and said it had a "far-ranging and bawdy satirical spirit." Film critic Kevin Stewart said "such political satire is very fitting for the manner and the times."

"There’s enough of the divinely comic in this 'Inferno' to justify a pair of sequels"
-Peter Keough, Boston Phoenix, March 2007

"...feels like the unholy offspring of Mike Judge and R. Crumb."
– Robert Abele, LA Times, May 2007

Director Sean Meredith won the "Best Director" award at the Silver Lake Film Festival in Los Angeles in 2007, and the film won the "Audience Favorite" award at the San Francisco IndieFest in 2007.  Boston Underground Film Festival gave it the Spirit of Underground award in 2007.  The jury at the 2007 Lausanne Underground Film and Music Festival gave the award for Best Narrative Feature.

References

External links
Official site

2007 films
Films based on Inferno (Dante)
Puppet films
2007 comedy films
American comedy films
2000s English-language films
2000s American films
American political satire films